An ultrafast molecular process is any technology that relies on properties of molecules that are only extant for a very short period of time (less than 1e-9 seconds). Such processes are very important in areas such as combustion chemistry and in the study of proteins.

References
Ultrafast molecular processes from Sandia National Laboratories

Chemical reactions